Colegiata de Santa María la Mayor (Salas) is a church in  Asturias, Spain. The church was established in the 16th century. It contains a mausoleum.

See also
Asturian art
Catholic Church in Spain

References

Churches in Asturias
16th-century establishments in Spain
16th-century Roman Catholic church buildings in Spain
Roman Catholic churches in Spain
Bien de Interés Cultural landmarks in Asturias